AHRC may refer to:

 Alberta Human Rights Commission
 Asian Human Rights Commission
 Assam Human rights Commission, India
 Assisted Human Reproduction Canada
 Arts and Humanities Research Council, United Kingdom
 Atlanta Harm Reduction Coalition, Georgia, United States
 Australian Human Rights Commission

See also
 AHRC New York City, formerly the Association for the Help of Retarded Children